John Burke (circa 1843–1900) was a photographer, best known for his photographs of the Second Anglo-Afghan War between 1878 and 1880. He was born in Ireland, around 1843, where he was a tradesman. He applied for a job in the British Army as an official photographer but travelled to Afghanistan at his own expense using heavy cameras that would have needed transporting on pack animals through mountainous regions. Burke was the first significant photographer of Afghanistan. He died in 1900.

Burke's photographs have been grouped in albums with those of Benjamin Simpson and other photographers, so definitive attribution is not possible for some of his works.

Gallery

See also
 Samuel Bourne
 Frederick Fiebig
 Linnaeus Tripe

References

Irish photographers
War photographers
Photography in India
Year of birth uncertain
1900 deaths